The 2005 Legg Mason Tenis Classic was the 36th edition of this tennis tournament and was played on outdoor hard courts.  The tournament was part of the International Series of the 2005 ATP Tour. It was held at the William H.G. FitzGerald Tennis Center in Washington, D.C. from August 1 through August 7, 2005.

Finals

Singles

 Andy Roddick defeated  James Blake, 7–5, 6–3
It was Roddick's 4th title of the year and the 19th of his career.

Doubles

 Bob Bryan /  Mike Bryan defeated  Wayne Black /  Kevin Ullyett, 6–4, 6–2

References

External links
 Official website
 ATP tournament profile

Legg Mason
Washington Open (tennis)
Legg Mason Tennis Classic
2005 in sports in Washington, D.C.